Wilfredo Almonte (born 22 November 1958) is a retired Dominican Republic long jumper.

He finished seventh at the 1979 Pan American Games (triple jump), won the silver medal at the 1982 Central American and Caribbean Games, and finished sixth at the 1983 Pan American Games. He also competed at the 1983 World Championships in both the 100 metres and the long jump without reaching the final of either.

His personal best jump leading up to the World Championships was 7.89 metres, achieved in June 1983 in San Juan, Puerto Rico.

References

1958 births
Living people
Dominican Republic long jumpers
Dominican Republic triple jumpers
World Athletics Championships athletes for the Dominican Republic
Central American and Caribbean Games silver medalists for the Dominican Republic
Pan American Games competitors for the Dominican Republic
Athletes (track and field) at the 1979 Pan American Games
Athletes (track and field) at the 1983 Pan American Games
Central American and Caribbean Games medalists in athletics
Competitors at the 1982 Central American and Caribbean Games